The Punk Terrorist Anthology Vol. 1 is a compilation album released in 2004 by American crust punk band Nausea on Brad Logan's Blacknoise Recordings. The album consists of previously released songs.

Track list

References

Nausea (band) albums
2004 compilation albums